This is a list of films which placed number-one at the weekend box office in Argentina during 2019. Amounts are in American dollars.

Highest-grossing films

See also 
 List of Argentine films of 2019

References 

Argentina
2019